Mount Henry may refer to one of these mountains:

Mount Henry (Alberta), Canada
Mount Henry (California), in Kings Canyon National Park
Mount Henry (Montana), in Glacier National Park, United States
Mount Henry (Enderby Land), in Antarctica
Mount Henry (Ross Dependency), in Antarctica

See also 
Mount Henry Lucy, in Antarctica
Mount Henry Peninsula, a peninsula in Western Australia
Henry Mountain, a mountain in Colorado
Henry Mountains, a mountain range in Utah